Dilochrosis balteata, the red spotted chafer, is a beetle of the family Scarabaeidae, subfamily Cetoniinae.

Description

Distribution
This species is present in Indonesia, New Guinea and Australia.

References

Cetoniinae
Beetles described in 1871
Taxa named by Samuel Constantinus Snellen van Vollenhoven